Tark Darreh (also known as Tarkeh Darreh) is a village in Safa Khaneh Rural District, in the Central District of Shahin Dezh County, West Azerbaijan Province, Iran. At the 2006 census, its population was 135, in 25 families.

References 

Populated places in Shahin Dezh County